Neira is a town and municipality in the Colombian Department of Caldas. Located along the Colombian coffee growing axis, it was named part of the "Coffee Cultural Landscape" UNESCO World Heritage Site in 2011.

References

Municipalities of Caldas Department